Shad Mehan (also Romanized as Shād Mehan, Shādīman, and Shādmahan; also known as Shad Jin and Shād Mahand) is a village in Qazqanchay Rural District, Arjomand District, Firuzkuh County, Tehran Province, Iran. At the 2006 census, its population was 282, in 78 families.

References 

Populated places in Firuzkuh County